The Rose Blumkin Performing Arts Center or The Rose, also known as the Astro Theater, originally opened as The Riviera. It is located in downtown Omaha, Nebraska. Built in 1926 in a combination of both Moorish and Classical styles, the building was rehabilitated in 1986.

History

Noted for lavish stage shows combined with movies, the Riviera was regarded as one of the most elegant entertainment facilities in the Midwest. John Eberson, a nationally notable architect, built the theater as an example of the "atmospheric" theater popular during the 1920s. In a style created by Eberson, these atmospheric theaters simulated romantic outdoor Mediterranean courtyards with a night sky above, including twinkling stars and drifting clouds.

The exterior of the building features a large copper domed tower, flanked by two smaller towers of similar detailing. The diamond-patterned brick facades contain oriel windows, elaborate cornices, glazed terra-cotta tile copings, and a series of free-standing columns which support griffins.

In 1929, experiencing financial losses, the theater's owner sold the building to Paramount Company and the theater was renamed the Paramount Theater.  In 1957, Paramount vacated the lease to Creighton University.   Closed for several years, it was later leased to J.S.B. Amusement, and after renovations, was operated as a bowling alley.  After only a year of operation, the building once again was remodeled to return it to a theater.   It reopened as the Astro theater and continued operations until June 1980.

Now closed and facing possible demolition, the Astro Theater was sold by Creighton University to Rose Blumkin of the Nebraska Furniture Mart on June 24, 1981. In the early 1990s it was renovated and transformed into the Rose Blumkin Performing Arts Center; it became the home of the Omaha Theater Company, which began performing there in 1995.

See also
History of Omaha
 List of theaters in Omaha, Nebraska
Creighton Orpheum Theater
Moon Theater
Rialto Theater
World Theater

References

External links

 Historic Photo of The Riveria's Interior
 Alternate Historic Photo of The Riveria's Interior
 Postcard of The Riviera Theater
 Historic Photo of The Rivera Theater
 Riviera Theater Grand Opening Advertisement
 Historic Photo of The Paramount Theater
 Paramount Theater Advertisement
 Astro Theater Advertisement

National Register of Historic Places in Omaha, Nebraska
Omaha Landmarks
Theatres completed in 1926
Theatres in Omaha, Nebraska
Cinemas and movie theaters in Nebraska
History of Downtown Omaha, Nebraska
Theatres on the National Register of Historic Places in Nebraska
1926 establishments in Nebraska
John Eberson buildings
Atmospheric theatres